Live is an album by soul and funk artists  Junior Walker and the All-Stars released in 1970 on the Tamla Motown label.

Track listing

References

1970 live albums
Junior Walker albums
albums produced by Johnny Bristol
Live albums by American artists
Tamla Records live albums
Motown live albums